Sherif Ashraf Hamid Oqila (born on 1 January 1987) is an Egyptian international footballer who plays as a striker. He is known as a prolific goalscorer and is renowned for his mastery of set pieces.

Club career

Al-Ahly youth academy
He is a graduate of the Al-Ahly youth academy. He was the top scorer in the history of the Egyptian youth league for seven seasons after scoring over 280 goals. He was close to transfer to Belgian giants Standard Liège together with his teammate Mohamed El Shenawy, however El-Ahly management interfered with the transfer.
He became known as a machine scorer when he scored 70 goals in the season 2006–2007, and was transferred to his club's arch rivals Zamalek as a free agent after not signing a professional contract with Al-Ahly. Al-Ahly later claimed that Ashraf had signed a contract but the paperwork turned out to be forged. As a result, the Egyptian Football Association placed a 50,000 Egyptian Pounds fine on Al-Ahly.

Zamalek SC
Ashraf was the top scorer in his team in the season 2008–2009 with 6 goals. In the Egyptian Premier League he wore number 32 but in 2009-2010 he shifted his shirt number to 4.

El Gouna FC
In 2010, he signed for El Gouna FC for a transfer fee worth 125,000 Euros, despite his expiring contract with Zamalek. He finished his first season as the team's top-scorer followed by Ahmed Hassan Farag.

HJK Helsinki
In order to regain match fitness because the league was postponed in Egypt, he signed for HJK Helsinki in March 2012, also citing as a reason his desire to attempt a breakthrough in European football. On April 26, 2012, Ashraf made his debut for HJK Helsinki against Jaro in a Quarter final Suomen Cup game. On May 9, 2012, Ashraf scored his debut goal with the club with a header from a corner kick to make the score 1-0 for his club against FC KooTeePee in the semi-final of the Suomen Cup.

FF Jaro
On September 4, 2012, Ashraf was loaned out to Veikkausliiga side FF Jaro for the remainder of the season. He scored 3 important goals in the final 3 games of the season and assisted 4 times. He scored his debut goal against JJK. His second and third goals for the club were both historic. He scored the fastest goal in the league's history (11 seconds) in a 3–3 draw with Mariehamn, and the third was the winning goal against TPS, the goal which kept Jaro in the Veikkausliiga for another season. Sherif was selected in the Veikkausliiga October team of the month.

Haras El-Hodood
On February 26, 2013, despite an offer from FF Jaro, he joined Haras El-Hodood until the end of the 2012–2013 season.

FC Biel-Bienne
On July 18, 2013, Sherif Ashraf made a quick comeback to European football joining Swiss Challenge League side FC Biel-Bienne. He took the league by storm, scoring 4 goals in his first 117 minutes on the pitch.

El-Gouna
In early 2014, Ashraf made a surprise move back to Egypt, signing a short-term deal at El Gouna FC. He scored his first goal after less than 15 minutes on the field. In summer 2014, he renewed his contract at the club.

El-Mokawloon and El-Entag El-Harby

Despite strong performances from Ashraf, El-Gouna's relegation meant that he had to leave the club. He chose El Mokawloon SC in August 2015. After managerial changes, he moved on loan to  El-Entag El-Harby SC in January 2016, making his debut against El Mokawloon.

International career

International Call-Ups

Ashraf's performances caught the attention of the Egyptian National Team, who gave him his first senior national call-up in the friendly match against Georgia

Correct as of 14 January 2013

Honors

with Zamalek
Egyptian Cup (2008)

with HJK Helsinki
Finnish Premier League (2012)

References

1987 births
Living people
Egyptian footballers
Egypt international footballers
Zamalek SC players
El Gouna FC players
Helsingin Jalkapalloklubi players
Veikkausliiga players
Egyptian expatriate footballers
Expatriate footballers in Finland
Sportspeople from Alexandria
Egyptian Premier League players
Egyptian expatriate sportspeople in Saudi Arabia
Expatriate footballers in Saudi Arabia
Jeddah Club players
Saudi First Division League players
Haras El Hodoud SC players
Al Mokawloon Al Arab SC players
El Entag El Harby SC players
FC Biel-Bienne players
Egyptian expatriate sportspeople in Switzerland
Expatriate footballers in Switzerland
Association football forwards